Charlotte, Lady Blennerhassett (19 February 1843 – 11 February 1917) was a German writer and biographer.

Life
Countess Charlotte Julia von Leyden was born in Munich in 1843. She met Sir Rowland Blennerhassett, 4th Baronet in 1870 and married him on 9 June of the same year. The new Lady Blennerhassett took to writing, and her most noted work was a biography of Madame de Staël. This was published in Germany in three volumes. After this she wrote a number of other biographies including one of Mary, Queen of Scots, and two chapters for Volume X of The Cambridge Modern History, published in 1907.

Her children included Sir Arthur Charles Francis Bernard Blennerhassett, 5th Baronet, and Marie Galway.

Blennerhassett died in Munich in 1917.

Selected publications
 Frau von Staël, ihre Freunde und ihre Bedeutung in Politik und Literatur. Berlin 1887–1889.
 Madame de Staël, her friends and her influence in politics and literature. 1889
 Talleyrand. 1894. (orig. German version)
 Talleyrand. 1894, trans. from the German by Frederick Clarke
 Maria Stuart, Königin von Schottland, 1542–1587; nach den neuesten Forschungen und Veröffentlichungen aus Staatsarchiven dargestellt. 1902.
 Chateaubriand : Romantik und die Restaurationsepoche in Frankreich. 1903.
 John Henry Kardinal Newman: ein Beitrag zur religiösen Entwicklungsgeschichte der Gegenwart. Berlin 1904.
 Die Jungfrau von Orleans. 1906.
 Louis XIV and Madame de Maintenon. 1910.
 Streiflichter. 1911. (trans. as Sidelights)
 Sidelights. 1913, trans. from the German by Edith Gülcher

References

External links 
 
 

1843 births
1917 deaths
19th-century German women writers
20th-century German women writers
Charlotte
German biographers
German countesses
German emigrants to England
German women historians
Writers from Munich
Wives of baronets
Women from Bavaria
German women biographers